Florita may refer to:

Florita, a character in the 1986 Spanish film Tiempo de Silencio
Memphis florita, a synonym of Memphis catinka in the Memphis (genus) of butterflies
Kira Florita, a Grammy winning music producer
Florita, a renamed former Empire ship, formerly the Empire Roding
Typhoon Florita (disambiguation)

See also
Fluorite, called "flourita" in some languages
Florida (disambiguation)
Floritam